Johann Christoph Pepusch (1667 –  1752), also known as  John Christopher Pepusch and Dr Pepusch, was a German-born composer who spent most of his working life in England.  He was born in Berlin, son of a vicar, and was married to Margherita de l'Epine who also performed in some of his theatrical productions.

Early life 
Pepusch studied music theory under Martin Klingenberg, cantor of the Marienkirche in Berlin. At the age of 14, he was appointed to the Prussian court where he gave music lessons to the future Frederick William I of Prussia.  He resigned this position in 1698 after witnessing the execution of an officer without trial.  He then first went to Amsterdam.  In 1704, he settled in England but continued to publish in Amsterdam until 1718.

Career 
At first, Pepusch earned a living playing the viola, then as a theatre director, music theoretician, teacher and organist.  In 1726, Pepusch founded The Academy of Vocal Music with others; in around 1730–1, it was renamed The Academy of Ancient Music. In Joseph Doane's Musical directory for the year 1794, the founding of the Academy is discussed. On page 76, Doane states:

He also founded the Madrigal Society.  Both were devoted to researching the history of music but specifically music of the Elizabethan period.  In 1713 he was awarded the degree of Doctor of Music by the University of Oxford.

Pepusch remained Director of the Academy until his death in 1752, and had established England as an important location for the study of music history.  He was succeeded at the Academy by Benjamin Cooke, one of his pupils. His many pupils also included William Boyce and John Bennett.  Pepusch died in London at the age of 85.

For a period of twenty years, Pepusch also directed the musical establishment at Cannons, a large stately home at Edgware, Middlesex, northwest of London. He was employed there by James Brydges, 1st Duke of Chandos. For a few years, he worked alongside George Frideric Handel, who had a role described as composer in residence. Both men were at Cannons in 1717/18.

Amongst English musicologists, Pepusch is considered significant foremost for his teaching role, but is best known for his arrangement of the music for The Beggar's Opera (1728) — to the libretto of John Gay. He composed works of all forms, including stage and church music as well as concertos and continuo sonatas.  He often made use of popular dance forms, such as the gigue and sarabande.

References

Sources
Baker, C. H. Collins and Baker, Muriel I. (1949). The Life and Circumstances of James Brydges, First Duke of Chandos. Oxford: Clarendon Press.

External links

Digitized images of Old English Songs containing works by Pepusch, housed at the University of Kentucky Libraries Special Collections Research Center
            

1667 births
1752 deaths
18th-century classical composers
German Baroque composers
Burials at Brompton Cemetery
Fellows of the Royal Society
German male classical composers
German music theorists
German opera composers
Male opera composers
Members of the Academy of Ancient Music
Members of the Royal Society of Musicians
18th-century German composers
18th-century German male musicians